Mark B. Messmer is a Republican member of the Indiana State Senate, representing the Senate District 48 since November 19, 2014. Messmer is a former member of the Indiana House of Representatives, representing three terms for the 63rd district from November 5, 2008, to November 4, 2014. He previously served on the Holy Family School Board from 2001 to 2004. He served as its president from 2003 to 2004.

Messmer supported the state mandated purchase of syngas through coal gasification technology. Developers of Leucadia National proposed a $2.6 billion syngas plant in Rockport, Indiana. Under the terms of the deal endorsed by Messmer, the state of Indiana would have bought syngas under a 30-year contract and then mandate that utilities within the state pass on any losses from the transaction on to Hoosier customers. Gas from the plant would make up about 17 percent of the state's supply. The deal received criticism due to government intrusion in the energy markets, and for forcing consumers to sign up for risky long-term gas purchases at prices substantially higher than market prices. Questions were also raised due to Leucadia National hiring Mark Lubbers to promote the deal. Lubbers is a former aide and close friend of former governor Mitch Daniels. The project was ultimately panned by the state legislature in 2013.

In 2022, Messmer sponsored a bill that bans the foreign ownership of agricultural land in Indiana.

References

External links
Mark Messmer at Ballotpedia
State Representative Mark Messmer official Indiana State Legislature site
 

21st-century American politicians
Republican Party Indiana state senators
Living people
Republican Party members of the Indiana House of Representatives
People from Jasper, Indiana
Purdue University alumni
Year of birth missing (living people)